Haris Memić (born 26 March 1995) is a Dutch professional footballer who plays as a defender.

Career

In 2014, Memić signed for Dutch second division side TOP Oss, where he made 2 league appearances and scored 0 goals.

In 2016, he left DESO in the Dutch lower leagues, before joining Slovak club Dukla Banská Bystrica.

In 2018, Memić signed for Lienden in the Dutch third division.

Before the second half of the 2019/20 campaign, he signed for Polish II liga outfit Bytovia Bytów after almost signing for a team in the United States.

Before the second half of the 2020/21 season, he signed for Polish I liga side Arka Gdynia.

References

External links
 
 

Dutch footballers
Expatriate footballers in Poland
I liga players
II liga players
Arka Gdynia players
People from Winterswijk
Footballers from Gelderland
Bytovia Bytów players
TOP Oss players
FC Lienden players
MFK Lokomotíva Zvolen players
FK Dukla Banská Bystrica players
Eerste Divisie players
Dutch expatriate sportspeople in Slovakia
Dutch expatriate sportspeople in Poland
2. Liga (Slovakia) players
Dutch expatriate footballers
Association football defenders
Tweede Divisie players
Expatriate footballers in Slovakia
Living people
1995 births